Capo Milazzo Lighthouse is an active lighthouse located at the northern extremity of the peninsula of Capo di Milazzo which extends toward the Tyrrhenian Sea in the province of Milazzo.

Description
The first lighthouse was built in 1853, than rebuilt in 1891 and recently restored in 2013. The lighthouse is fully automated, powered by a solar unit and is operated by the Marina Militare and is identified by the code number 3268 E.F.

See also
 List of lighthouses in Italy
 Capo di Milazzo

References

External links
 Servizio Fari Marina Militare

Lighthouses in Italy